Moss Side is a district of Manchester, England.

Moss Side may also refer to:

Places

United Kingdom
Moss-Side, County Antrim, a village in the Causeway Coast and Glens Borough Council area of Northern Ireland
Moss Side, Cumbria, a hamlet
Moss Side, Fylde, a hamlet in Westby-with-Plumptons, Lancashire
Moss Side railway station, on the line between Blackpool South and Preston
Moss Side, Knowsley, in the Metropolitan Borough of Knowsley, Merseyside
Moss Side, Leyland, a suburb of Leyland
Moss Side, Sefton, a suburb of Maghull
Moss Side, South Ribble, a village near Leyland, Lancashire

United States
Moss Side (Versailles, Kentucky), listed on the National Register of Historic Places in Woodford County, Kentucky
Moss Side (New Kent County, Virginia), a historic farm property

See also
Moss Side Story, a 1989 album by Barry Adamson, a native of Moss Side, Manchester